Bikar  is a small town and district in the Tambrauw Regency of Southwest Papua, Indonesia. The town is located on the northern coast of the Bird's Head Peninsula, also known as the Vogelkop Peninsula. Bikar is the second-least populous district in Tambrauw, with a population of 2.372 at the 2020 Census.

Administrative divisions
Bikar is divided into 10 villages which are:

Bikar
bukit
Nombrak
Suyam
syunai
Werbes
Wertam
Wertim
Werur
Werwaf

See also
Tambrauw Regency
Werur Airport
Amsterdam Island, West Papua
Middleburg Island

References 

Populated places in Southwest Papua
Populated places in Tambrauw

Southwest Papua